The Brannon Masculinity Scale (BMS) is a self-report measure of endorsement of masculine norms. It was developed by Robert Brannon and Samuel Juni in 1984.

The BMS has the following scales:
Avoiding femininity (16 items)
Concealing emotions (16 items)
Being the breadwinner (15 items)
Being admired and respected (16 items)
Toughness (16 items)
The male machine (16 items)
Violence and adventure (15 items)

All 110  items of the inventory consist of sentences anchored with a male noun (e.g. "A man always deserves the respect of his wife and children"). All items are rated on a 7-point Likert Scale from "strongly disagree" to "strongly agree".

Apart from this full 110 item form, a shorter 58 item form of the BMS exists and scores on this scale are highly correlated with those on the full scale (r=.89).

The BMS has the advantage of assessing attitudes towards masculinity without comparison to women and includes a broad range of masculinity standards, while it has the disadvantage of not assessing other attitudes e.g. towards male privilege or sexuality.

References 

Personality tests measuring masculinity-femininity